A Marsden motion is the only means by which a criminal defendant can fire a court-appointed attorney or communicate directly with a judge in a California state court. It is based on a defendant's claim that the attorney is providing ineffective assistance or has a conflict with the defendant. The name comes from the case People v. Marsden. A defendant is required to know to make a challenge of ineffective assistance of counsel, and make one, or the claim of ineffective assistance of counsel or the issue cannot be raised on appeal. There is no requirement to notify a defendant of such a requirement.

A criminal defendant cannot simply fire a court-appointed attorney. The trial judge has discretion whether or not to appoint new counsel on request of the defendant.

A Marsden motion is a unique means by which a criminal defendant can communicate with the court. A criminal defendant who is represented by counsel can only communicate with the court through that counsel. Since that counsel's competency or ability to work with the defendant is being challenged, the attorney cannot at the same time defend against and represent the defendant's claims of incompetency or conflict. So the California courts allow a defendant represented by court-appointed counsel to directly communicate with the trial judge in the context of a Marsden motion, and only in such a context.

A Marsden motion is a formal request made by a criminal defendant to the court. The court hears
arguments on the motion from the defendant and the attorney, without the presence of the prosecutor. The basis for making the motion may be inadequate or ineffective assistance of counsel, legal malpractice, or because there is a conflict between attorney and client that substantially interferes with the attorney representing the client. The defendant must establish either that the representation has been inadequate, or that a conflict makes it likely that it will be inadequate. In the case of a denial of the motion, the standard of review is abuse of discretion.

Essential elements

Conflict between client and attorney
The language of the Marsden decision contains the sufficient criterion that attorney and defendant are "embroiled in such an irreconcilable conflict that ineffective representation is likely to result."

Inadequacy of representation

Marsden case
In 1968, defendant Michael John Marsden was charged and convicted of crimes in California. Marsden appealed the conviction. The only stated basis of the appeal was that he was denied his constitutional right to counsel because his counsel was ineffective.

At trial, Marsden complained that his attorney was not adequately representing him before his trial.  Marsden asked the court to appoint another attorney. The judge refused to listen to the specific examples Marsden tried to tell the judge. Marsden was convicted, and appealed. The appeals court found that the judge must consider specific examples of inadequate representation before deciding whether or not to appoint a new attorney for a criminal defendant.

Marsden requested that his attorney be removed before his trial. He told the trial judge that he was receiving inadequate representation from the attorney. Marsden offered to give the court specific examples. The court would not let Marsden give the specific examples, and denied the motion to have Marsden's attorney removed. In his appeal, Marsden contended that this denial without giving him an opportunity to list specific examples of inadequate representation deprived him of a fair trial.

In its opinion, the appellate court cited the case of Gideon v. Wainwright as establishing that criminal defendants who cannot afford counsel are entitled under the constitution to have the court appoint an attorney to be paid for by the government. It held that this did not give a defendant the right to hire and fire attorneys beyond this appointment, and left it with the trial court to establish whether or not there is adequate assistance. In other words, the court has discretion as to whether to remove an attorney, not the defendant. However, the appellate court found that in Marsden's case, the trial court could not have properly exercised its discretion without allowing Marsden to specify instances of inadequate representation. The court found that critical information about the adequacy of representation may not be in the court records because of that inadequacy, so a defendant must have a right to specify them, and they must be inquired into by the court.

Associated cases
Marsden motion appeals have cited associated cases relevant to application of the case.

Right to Counsel
In Gideon v. Wainwright, it was determined that a criminal defendant who cannot afford an attorney is entitled to have a court appoint an attorney, and the government must pay for the attorney. Gideon was one of the bases for the Marsden decision.

Incompetent assistance of counsel

Conflict with attorney
Schell v. Witek found that forcing a criminal defendant to go to trial  with an irreconcilable conflict with their attorney would deprive them of effective assistance of counsel.

Even when counsel is found to be competent, it has been found that a conflict between counsel and defendant that cannot be resolved would create a situation where the defendant is being denied the right to counsel. In Daniels V. Woodford, it was found that when a court refuses to appoint new counsel after a defendant has completely lost trust in their attorney, that defendant is thereby effectively thereby constructively denied any counsel whatsoever, "Even if trial counsel is competent, a serious breakdown in communications can result in an inadequate defense."

Procedure of hearing Marsden motion

Presence of prosecutor
A prosecutor may not be present during a court hearing on a Marsden motion.

How a criminal defendant can file a Marsden motion
To require that a Marsden hearing be conducted, "no formal motion is necessary, [but] there must be 'at least some clear indication by defendant that [they] want a substitute attorney.'" Valdez, citing People v. Luck, 45 Ca. 3d 259 (1988

Order of hearing during insanity motions
When an attorney makes a motion for determination as to whether or not a criminal defendant is competent, a Marsden motion must be heard before the competency hearing, known as a section 1368 hearing. People v. Stankewitz held that although criminal proceedings must be halted during a hearing for competency, a Marsden motion is not a criminal proceeding and must be heard first. "Hearing a Marsden motion during a competency hearing does not reinstate criminal proceedings against the defendant." From People v. Stankewitz: 

A court refusing a Marsden motion prior to a 1368 hearing is a judicial error, according to People v. Solorzano. However, a subsequent appeal court decision in People v. Govea did not consider such error to be prejudicial, and did not reverse a conviction, finding that "there was no prejudicial Marsden error".

Presentation of evidence
Defendants may present evidence in support of their Marsden motion.

Witnesses

Document subpoenas

Paper trail
Defendants making Marsden motions are often advised by advocates to create a clear paper trail. This is because the court often gives more credibility to attorneys than to criminal defendants, and a successful motion may trigger a state Bar investigation if granted based on ineffective assistance. Aram Byer James, a former public defender and watchdog of abuses by the public defender, who teaches defendants and their families how to file a Marsden Motion, emphasizes creation of a paper trail as essential to the success of the motion prior to trial, or to basing an appeal on the denial of the motion.

References

California law
Legal motions